The DINFIA IA 53 Mamboretá (Guaraní for "Praying Mantis") was an agricultural aircraft developed in Argentina by DINFIA in the 1960s.

Description 

The IA 53 was a single-engine low-wing cantilever monoplane of conventional undercarriage configuration with fixed tailwheel. Accommodation for the pilot and a single passenger was provided under a broad bubble canopy.

Two prototypes were constructed, with the type making its first flight on 10 November 1966. No production followed, with FMA instead building the Cessna 188 under license.

Aircraft on display
One aircraft is preserved at the Museo Nacional de Aeronáutica de Argentina in Morón, Buenos Aires.

Specifications

References

Notes

Bibliography

 
 

1960s Argentine agricultural aircraft
FMA aircraft
Low-wing aircraft
Single-engined tractor aircraft
Aircraft first flown in 1965